Palanivel Thiagarajan (PTR) is an Indian politician and the current Finance Minister of Tamil Nadu. He was elected to the Tamil Nadu Legislative  Assembly election in 2016 and 2021 from Madurai Central.

Early life
He is the son of the late P. T. R. Palanivel Rajan, who was also a well-known politician in Tamil Nadu. His grandfather, P. T. Rajan, was the Chief Minister of Madras Presidency from 4 April 1936, to 24 August 1936.

Following his schooling at The Lawrence School, Lovedale, and Vikaasa School, Madurai, Thiagarajan, he graduated with a degree in chemical engineering from the National Institute of Technology, Tiruchirappalli (formerly, Regional Engineering College, Tiruchirappalli). He obtained a master's degree in operations research and a Ph.D. in human factors engineering/engineering psychology at University at Buffalo. He then completed his MBA in financial management at MIT Sloan School of Management. He is a patent holder of Methods & systems for providing structured loan commitment transactions.

Corporate career 
He began his career in 1990 as an independent consultant in Operations and Systems Improvement. In 2001 he joined Lehman Brothers Holdings Inc. as Trader and Co-Portfolio Manager – Firm Relationship Loan Portfolio. He quit Lehman Brothers Holdings Inc. as Head Of Offshore Capital Markets in the year 2008. He then worked for Standard Chartered Bank, Singapore in the Global Capital Markets division. He quit Standard Chartered Bank as Managing Director, Financial Markets Sales in 2014.

Political career 
Thiagarajan was elected as the  Member of the Legislative Assembly (MLA) from Madurai Central Assembly constituency in the 2016 Tamil Nadu Legislative Assembly election. He was re-elected in the 2021 Tamil Nadu Legislative Assembly election

He is the Finance and Human Resources Management Minister of Tamil Nadu since May 2021. He has released a White Paper on Tamil Nadu's finances after a long time.

Electoral performance

Personal life 
He married Margaret, whom he met at University at Buffalo where he pursued his Ph.D. while pursuing her master's. They have two sons.

References

 1966 births
 Living people
 Tamil Nadu MLAs 2016–2021
 Dravida Munnetra Kazhagam politicians
 National Institute of Technology, Tiruchirappalli alumni
 University at Buffalo alumni
 MIT Sloan School of Management alumni
 Indian investment bankers
 Tamil Nadu MLAs 2021–2026